Dover High School is a comprehensive public secondary school located in rural, distant community of Dover, Arkansas, United States. The school educates more than 350 students annually in grades nine through twelve. Dover is one of five public high schools in Pope County and is the sole high school administered by the Dover School District. The first graduating class of six students, all female, completed studies in the spring of 1923.

Academics 
The assumed course of study for students is to complete the Smart Core curriculum developed by the Arkansas Department of Education (ADE), which requires students complete at least 22 units for graduation. Course offerings include regular and Advanced Placement classes and exams with opportunities for college credit via AP exam. The school is accredited by the ADE.

Fine Arts
Students may participate in various musical and performing arts including: band (e.g., concert band, jazz band, marching band), choir (e.g., a Concert Choir, Madrigals, Ladies Ensemble, and Barbershop Quartet) and theater (e.g., competitive speech, drama, stagecraft). Students may participate in Art Club. Both the Dover Senior High Band and Choir programs have been the recipient of various statewide awards. Most recently, the Dover Senior High Choirs were recognized as State Champions at the 2013 Arkansas Choral Performance Assessment under the direction of Mrs. Carrie Taylor. The Dover Midnight Brigade (marching band) has been hailed the "Pride of Pope County."

Athletics 
The Dover High School mascot is the Pirate with corresponding references to the Jolly Roger flag and with the school colors of black and white.

For the 2012–14 seasons, the Dover Pirates participate in the 4A Region 4 Conference. Competition is primarily sanctioned by the Arkansas Activities Association with student-athletes competing in football, volleyball, baseball, basketball (boys/girls), competitive cheer, dance, golf (boys/girls), soccer (boys/girls), softball, tennis (boys/girls), track and field (boys/girls).

Notable people 
Kevin Hern (1980) member of the United States House of Representatives

References

External links
 

1922 establishments in Arkansas
Educational institutions established in 1922
Public high schools in Arkansas
Schools in Pope County, Arkansas